Tony Padilla may refer to:
 Tony Padilla (13 Reasons Why), fictional character in the Netflix television series
 Antonio (Tony) Padilla, English physics professor, Numberphile contributor and googologist